James Richard Maguire (6 February 1886 – 1 December 1966) was a New Zealand rugby union player. Mainly a backrow forward, Maguire represented  at a provincial level between 1905 and 1910. He was a member of the New Zealand national side, the All Blacks, on their 1910 tour of Australia. He played six matches for the All Blacks on that tour—five of them at hooker—including three internationals.

Maguire was also a noted rower, being a part of the Waitemata four that won a national title in 1909.

Maguire died in Lower Hutt on 1 December 1966, and was buried at Karori Cemetery.

References

1886 births
1966 deaths
Rugby union players from Auckland
New Zealand rugby union players
New Zealand international rugby union players
Auckland rugby union players
Rugby union hookers
Rugby union flankers
New Zealand male rowers
Burials at Karori Cemetery